The Transport and General Workers Union (TGWU) was created in 1922 from a merger of fourteen unions and continued to grow through a series of mergers, amalgamations and transfers of engagements.  This process, which is recorded below in chronological order, continued through to 2007 when the TGWU itself merged with Amicus to form a new union called UNITE.

1922 (founder members)
 Amalgamated Society of Watermen, Lightermen and Bargemen
 Amalgamated Carters, Lurrymen and Motormen's Union
 Amalgamated Association of Carters and Motormen
 Associated Horsemen's Union
 Dock, Wharf, Riverside and General Labourers' Union
 Labour Protection League
 National Amalgamated Labourers' Union
 National Union of Docks, Wharves and Shipping Staffs
 National Union of Ships' Clerks, Grain Weighers and Coalmeters
 National Union of Vehicle Workers
 National Amalgamated Coal Workers' Union
 North of England Trimmers' and Teemers Association
 North of Scotland Horse and Motormen's Association
 United Vehicle Workers

1922 (later amalgamations)
 National Union of Dock, Riverside and General Workers
 Scottish Union of Dock Labourers
 National Union of British Fishermen
 Greenock Sugar Porters' Association

1923
 North Wales Craftsmen and General Workers' Union
 North Wales Quarrymen's Union

1924
 Belfast Breadservers' Trade Union
 United Order of General Labourers

1925
 Association of Coastwise Masters, Mates and Engineers
 Weaver Watermen's Association

1926
 Irish Mental Hospital Workers' Union
 National Amalgamated Union of Enginemen, Firemen, Mechanics, Motormen and Electrical Workers

1928
 Cumberland Enginemen, Boilermen and Electrical Workers' Union

1929
 Public Works and Constructional Operatives' Union (Staffordshire District)
 Workers' Union

1930
 Belfast Operative Bakers' Union
 Northern Ireland Textile Workers' Union

1933
 Portadown Textile Workers' Union
 Scottish Farm Servants' Union
 London Co-operative Mutuality Club Collectors' Association

1934
 National Union of Co-operative Insurance Society Employees
 Scottish Busmen's Union
 Altogether Builders' Labourers and Constructional Workers' Society

1935
 National Winding and General Engineers' Society

1936
 Electricity Supply Staff Association (Dublin)
 Halifax and District Carters' and Motormen's Association

1937
 Power Loom Tenters' Trade Union of Ireland
 Belfast Journeymen Butchers' Association
 Scottish Seafishers' Union

1938
 Humber Amalgamated Steam Trawlers' Engineers, and Firemen's Union
 Imperial War Graves Commission Staff Association
 Port of London Deal Porters' Union

1939
 North of England Engineers' and Firemen's Amalgamation

1940
 National Glass Workers' Trade Protection Association
 Radcliffe and District Enginemen and Boilermen's Provident Society
 National Glass Bottle Makers' Society

1943
 Manchester Ship Canal Pilots' Association

1944
 Grangemouth Pilots' Association

1945
 Leith and Granston Pilots
 Dundee Pilots
 Methil Pilots

1947
 Government Civil Employees' Association
 Liverpool and District Carters' and Motormen's Union

1951
 Lurgan Hemmers' Veiners' and General Workers' Union

1952
 United Cut Nail Makers of Great Britain Protection Society

1961
 Scottish Textile Workers' Union

1962
 National Union of Shale Miners and Oil Workers

1963
 Gibraltar Confederation of Labour
 Gibraltar Apprentices and Ex-Apprentices Union
 Gibraltar Labour Trades Union

1965
 North of Ireland Operative Butchers' and Allied Workers' Association
 United Fishermen's Union

1967
 Cardiff, Penarth and Barry Coal Trimmers' Union

1968
 National Association of Operative Plasterers
 Scottish Slaters, Tilers, Roofers and Cement Workers' Society

1969
 Amalgamated Society of Foremen Lightermen of River Thames
 Irish Union of Hairdressers and Allied Workers
 Port of Liverpool Staff Association
 Process and General Workers' Union

1970
 Sheffield Amalgamated Union of File Trades

1971
 Scottish Commercial Motormen's Union
 Watermen, Lightermen, Tugmen and Bargemen's Union
 Chemical Workers' Union

1972
 National Union of Vehicle Builders
 Scottish Transport and General Workers' Union (Docks)

1973
 Iron, Steel and Wood Barge Builders and Helpers Association

1974
 Union of Bookmakers Employees
 Union of Kodak Workers

1975
 File Grinders' Society

1976
 Grimsby Steam and Diesel Fishing Vessels Engineers' and Firemen's Union

1978
 National Association of Youth Hostel Wardens
 Staff Association for Royal Automobile Club Employees

1982
 National Union of Agricultural and Allied Workers
 National Amalgamated Stevedores' and Dockers' Society
 National Union of Dyers, Bleachers and Textile Workers

1984
 Burnley, Nelson, Rossendale and District Textile Workers' Union
 Northern Textile and Allied Workers' Union
 Sheffield Sawmakers' Protection Society

1987
 Amalgamated Union of Asphalt Workers
 National Tile, Faience and Mosaic Fixers' Society

1993
 Lancashire Box, Packing Case and General Woodworkers' Society
 Yorkshire Association of Power Loom Overlookers

1995
 Electrical and Plumbing Industries Union

1997
 National Association of Licensed House Managers

2000
 Northern Carpet Trades Union

2004
 National Union of Lock and Metal Workers

2006
 Community and Youth Workers' Union

2007
In 2007 the T&G merged with Amicus to form Unite.

See also

 List of trade unions

References

 
TGWU
TGWU
Transport and General Workers' Union